Amanda Coetzer was the defending champion but did not compete that year.

Julie Halard won in the final 6–4, 6–4 against Ludmila Richterová.

Seeds
A champion seed is indicated in bold text while text in italics indicates the round in which that seed was eliminated.

  Julie Halard (champion)
  Katerina Maleeva (first round)
  Chanda Rubin (first round)
  Linda Harvey-Wild (first round)
  Åsa Carlsson (quarterfinals)
  Silke Meier (second round)
  Lea Ghirardi (first round)
  Stephanie Rottier (semifinals)

Draw

External links
 1995 Prague Open draw

1995 - Singles
Singles